Bienvenu is the name of:

Surname
Alberto Bienvenu
Bernard Bienvenu
Henri Bienvenu (born 1988), Cameroonian footballer
Léon Bienvenu

Given name
Bienvenu de Miollis
Bienvenu Eva Nga
Bienvenu Mbida
Bienvenu Sawadogo

See also
Bienvenue (disambiguation)